Łabędnik   is a village in the administrative district of Gmina Bartoszyce, within Bartoszyce County, Warmian-Masurian Voivodeship, in northern Poland, close to the border with the Kaliningrad Oblast of Russia.

The village has a population of 470.

Notable residents
 Friedrich von der Groeben (1645-1712), general in the Turkish Wars

References

Villages in Bartoszyce County